Ali Akbar may refer to:
 Ali Akbar, East Azerbaijan
 Ali Akbar, Kermanshah